In Japan, the  is a special military official whose primary duties are to report military affairs to the Emperor and act as a close attendant (chamberlain). From 1896 through to 1945, a small number of army and naval aides-de-camp were supplied to the Emperor due to his increased status and the risks to him during wartime.

Background
An excerpt from the :
Aides-de-camp to the Emperor will perform attendant duties and will relay to him military matters and orders, be present at military reviews [in his name] and accompanying him to formal ceremonies and interviews.

Moreover, to the Crown Prince, the Imperial Family, and the mediatized Korean royal family (the former Korean imperial family), aides-de-camp were also provided. The military officers serving the Oukouzoku'' wore silver aiguillettes over their uniform.

List of aides-de-camp

Senior Aide-de-camp to the Emperor

See also
Chamberlain of Japan, a similar title without military duties
Imperial Household Agency

References

Japanese monarchy